Pokémon: Destiny Deoxys is a 2004 Japanese anime film directed by Kunihiko Yuyama. It is the seventh film in the Pokémon series and the second film released under Pocket Monsters Advanced Generation in Japan. The film stars the voices of Rica Matsumoto, Ikue Otani, Yuji Ueda, Kaori, Fushigi Yamada, Noriko Hidaka, Koichi Yamadera, Susumu Chiba, Kenji Nojima, and Becky. The events of the film take place during the seventh season of Pokémon: Advanced Challenge.

The film was released on July 17, 2004, in Japan. The English adaptation was produced by 4Kids Entertainment and distributed by Miramax Films and debuted on Kids' WB on January 22, 2005.

Director Kunihiko Yuyama visited the city of Vancouver, British Columbia, Canada to get ideas for the setting for the film.

Plot 
A mysterious meteorite is hurtling towards the earth. During its entry into the atmosphere, it almost wounds Rayquaza, a sky guardian living in the ozone layer. The meteorite crashes into a polar zone, revealing two egg-shaped objects. The purple egg regenerates into a Deoxys and picks up the green egg. Rayquaza descends from the ozone layer to fight the invader (believing it to be an enemy). A battle ensues, destroying a nearby research site and traumatizing a young boy Tory (Tou'i), scared by a stampede of Spheal, Sealeo, and Walrein. Deoxys engages Rayquaza and the two take turns delivering devastating blows to each other, but the fight draws to a conclusion when Rayquaza surprises the alien Pokémon and fires a point blank Hyper Beam at it. Deoxys' body is destroyed, leaving only the purple crystal in its chest that falls into the sea, while some researchers take a similar green crystal that it found with them to Hoenn. Beneath the sea, the injured Deoxys regenerates and waits.

Four years later, Ash, May, Brock, and Max travel to LaRousse City, where block robots patrol the area. There they meet Tory, who has since become afraid of Pokémon and a loner. Deoxys, which has fully healed, leaves to find the green crystal which Tory's parents are testing in a lab.

In the Battle Tower, Ash mistakes Tory for a Pokémon Trainer and they battle against Rafe and Sid, with Tory using Ash's Torkoal. However, Tory does not know how to handle Ash's Torkoal and they lose. Tory runs away, stopping to save a Minun which was trapped in a trash can. Later, Ash meets Tory's parents and they have fun until they see a mysterious purple aurora, signaling the return of Deoxys.

When Deoxys begins to remove the city's inhabitants to search for the green crystal using copies of itself, it is up to Ash, Pikachu, and Tory to help it find the crystal. This is complicated by the return of Rayquaza, and the security robots malfunctioning, which forces Deoxys to create a force field that disables the city's power. Later, Rayquaza manages to break through the force field. Deoxys and Rayquaza then continue to battle, causing havoc in the city. The green crystal is regenerated when Pikachu and Minun and Plusle charge the power generator in the lab. As the fight continues, Deoxys tackles Rayquaza into the floor. It prepares to finish off Rayquaza, but the green Deoxys arrives, fully regenerated, with perfect timing and quickly transforms into its Defense Forme, saving Rayquaza from the attack. The city is filled with blocks of robots when the chief robot becomes hostile, which overwhelm Rayquaza. The twin Deoxys form shields that protect Rayquaza. Seeing that the two Pokémon are willing to protect it in face of this new threat, Rayquaza begins firing Hyper Beams upon the thousands of robots.

Ash and Tory work together and ultimately manage to shut off the malfunctioning robots by disabling the chief robot, freeing the twin Deoxys and Rayquaza. Tory falls off the towers of robots trying to save Plusle and Minun, but is saved by the green Deoxys. Rayquaza, recognizing that the Deoxys aren't enemies, flies away peacefully, and the Deoxys form green and purple auroras in the sky as a goodbye to their friends, leaving to an unknown destination. Ash states that wherever they are going, at least they would always have each other. Tory, who has gotten over his fear of Pokémon, agrees and later bids Ash and the others farewell at the train station with his new friends, Plusle and Minun, on his shoulders. Ash and his friends continue on their journey through the Hoenn region.

Cast

Release

Theatrical run 
Pokemon: Destiny Deoxys was distributed theatrically in Japan by Toho on July 17, 2004, alongside Steamboy.

Broadcast airing 
It was released directly to television in the United States by 4Kids Entertainment in an English-language dub on January 22, 2005. Apparently, it aired on Toon Disney in 2007, alongside Pokémon 4Ever, as part of its Big Movie Show all day programming of animated movies featuring non-Disney animated movies. However, in January 2018, this film alongside Pokémon 4Ever, Pokémon Heroes and Pokémon: Jirachi—Wish Maker were not shown as part of Disney XD's Pokémon movie marathon as distributed by Miramax, after its former founder Harvey Weinstein was accused of sexual abuse and sexual harassment. Twitch also excluded the four films distributed by Miramax from its Pokémon marathon that same year.

Home media 
The original Japanese DVD and VHS releases occurred on December 21, 2004. The film was later released in the U.S. on DVD and VHS on February 15, 2005. In the UK, StudioCanal released the DVD on April 2, 2012.

The film was released on Blu-ray along with Pokémon Heroes on May 15, 2011, in the United States by Echo Bridge Home Entertainment.

The film was re-released on DVD on August 16, 2021, in the UK by Paramount Home Entertainment alongside Pokémon 4Ever and Pokémon Heroes.

Reception

Box office 
The film did not make it into the top 10 box office films in Japan due to the success of American blockbuster movies that year. However, it was ranked as the No. 1 anime film that year with $34m in box office sales, beating out Doraemon: Nobita in the Wan-Nyan Spacetime Odyssey ($26.5m), Detective Conan: Magician of the Silver Sky (Detective Conan feature film, $22m), Crayon Shin-chan: The Storm Called: The Kasukabe Boys of the Evening Sun ($11m), Naruto the Movie: Ninja Clash in the Land of Snow ($11m), Innocence ($8m), Steamboy ($8m) and Inuyasha the Movie: Fire on the Mystic Island ($7m). Its overall ranking is seventh place. The film was the tenth highest-grossing film in Japan for the year behind The Lord of the Rings: The Return of the King, Harry Potter and the Prisoner of Azkaban, Howl's Moving Castle, Crying Out Love in the Center of the World, The Last Samurai, Spider-Man 2, The Day After Tomorrow, Finding Nemo, and Troy.

Critical reception 
Pokemon: Destiny Deoxys generally got negative reviews. DVD Talk gave it a negative review saying that "I didn't find much of the film that was much superior to an average episode of Pokemon" and "unless you have a die-hard Pokemon fan in your household, this DVD should just be skipped". BellaOnline gave it a negative review saying that "while Pokemon: Destiny Deoxys is a decent film, I was rather disappointed by the lack of effort Miramax put into the DVD extras on this release" and that "however, if you are a fan of the Pokemon anime, you should purchase this DVD for your collection".

Notes

References

External links 

 

 Official pokemon.com site
 
 

2004 anime films
2000s Japanese-language films
Destiny Deoxys
Toho animated films
Films directed by Kunihiko Yuyama
Japanese sequel films
Films scored by Shinji Miyazaki
OLM, Inc. animated films